Randi Weingarten (born December 18, 1957) is an American labor leader, attorney, and educator. She is president of the American Federation of Teachers (AFT) and a member of the AFL–CIO. She is the former president of the United Federation of Teachers.

Early life
Rhonda "Randi" Weingarten was born in 1957 in New York City, to a Jewish family, Gabriel and Edith (Appelbaum) Weingarten. Her father was an electrical engineer and her mother a teacher. Weingarten grew up in Rockland County, New York, and attended Clarkstown High School North in New City, New York. A congregant of Congregation Beit Simchat Torah, she considers herself a deeply religious Jew.

Weingarten's interest in trade unions and political advocacy was formed during childhood. Her mother's union went on a seven-week strike when Weingarten was in the eleventh grade. Under New York state's Taylor Law, her mother could have been fired for taking part in a strike. Instead, she was fined two days' pay for every day she was on strike. Later that year, the school board cut $2 million from the budget. Weingarten and several other students convinced the school board to let them conduct a survey regarding the impact of the cuts. The survey led several school board members to change their minds, and rescind the cuts.

From 1979 to 1980, Weingarten was a legislative assistant for the Labor Committee of the New York State Senate. She received a B.S. degree in labor relations from the ILR School at Cornell University in 1980 and a J.D. degree from the Yeshiva University Cardozo School of Law in 1983.

Legal career
Weingarten worked as a lawyer for the firm of Stroock & Stroock & Lavan from 1983 to 1986, where she handled several acrimonious arbitration cases on behalf of the UFT. She was appointed an adjunct instructor at the Cardozo School of Law in 1986. She also worked as an attorney in the real estate department of Wien Malkin and Bettex.

In 1986, Weingarten became counsel to Sandra Feldman, then-president of the UFT. Weingarten handled high-level grievances for the union. She was also lead counsel for the union in a number of lawsuits against New York City and the state of New York over school funding and school safety. By the early 1990s, she was the union's primary negotiator in UFT contract negotiations. Her negotiating positions became more aggressive throughout the 1990s.

Teaching career
From 1991 to 1997 she taught at Clara Barton High School in Crown Heights, Brooklyn. The classes she taught included Law, Ethical Issues in Medicine, AP Political Science, and US History and Government. Weingarten was one of the coaches of students that competed in the We the People civics competition that won the New York state championship in 1994–95 and fourth in the national championship.

UFT career
Elected the UFT's treasurer in 1997, Weingarten succeeded Sandra Feldman as president of the union a year later when Feldman was elected president of the national American Federation of Teachers. Weingarten was elected a Vice President of the AFT the same year.

Weingarten was reelected by consistently wide margins after her initial appointment in 1998. The local union's constitution required her to run for the UFT presidency within a year of her appointment. She received 74 percent of the vote against two opponents in 1999, and served the final two years of Feldman's term. She ran in 2001 for a full term and was re-elected. She won her third full three-year term with more than 88 percent of the vote, despite having two opposing candidates. On March 30, 2007, Weingarten won reelection to a fourth term as UFT President, garnering 87 percent of the vote.

Weingarten stepped down from her post as president of the United Federation of Teachers on July 31, 2009. An opinion piece in the New York Post on January 16, 2011, characterized Weingarten's final paycheck from the UFT—which included payments for unused vacation days and sick time—as a $194,188 "golden parachute."

Collective bargaining
Weingarten began negotiating her first contract as UFT president in 2000. Talks with the Giuliani administration began in early September 2000, but the contract expired on November 15, 2000, without a new agreement. By March 2001, the talks deadlocked and a state mediator was called in. Talks collapsed again on June 5, and Weingarten asked for state arbitration.

To pressure Giuliani, Weingarten endorsed Alan Hevesi in the Democratic primary. In the run-off between Green and Ferrer, Weingarten endorsed Ferrer, who lost to Green. Michael Bloomberg defeated Green in the November 2001 election. Weingarten demanded a 22 percent wage hike; Giuliani offered 8 percent. Talks collapsed on March 9, and Weingarten began preparing the UFT for its first strike since the early 1970s. In the state arbitration panel's mid-April report, it advocated a major salary boost and a longer work week. Both sides agreed to a new collective bargaining agreement in June, raising wages 16 to 22 percent and lengthening the work week by 100 minutes.

The UFT's contract expired on May 31, 2003. Once again, negotiations proved contentious. In January 2004, New York City School Chancellor Joel Klein proposed a merit-pay deal; in February, Mayor Bloomberg proposed replacing the union's 200-page contract with an 8-page set of guidelines. Weingarten rejected these proposals, and asked for state mediation in late March 2004. In May, Weingarten agreed to discuss merit pay. The union began a public-relations campaign featuring subway and television ads demanding a contract and held protests and marches. On June 1, 2005, nearly 20,000 teachers—about a quarter of the UFT membership—packed Madison Square Garden for a rally at which Weingarten denounced Bloomberg and Klein, asked for a strike vote, and requested state arbitration. Contract talks resumed in August and September. A tentative contract was reached on October 3, 2005. The union won a wage increase of 14.25 percent over 52 months, retroactive to June 1, 2003. Other changes include a slightly longer workday (with the extra time devoted to tutoring) and the elimination of union control over some staffing decisions. The contract, ratified on November 3, 2005, passed with just 63 percent of UFT members in favor.

Weingarten concluded her third collective bargaining agreement on November 6, 2006, when the union and city reached a tentative deal to increase pay by 7.1 percent over two years. The agreement raised base pay for senior teachers above $100,000 a year, bringing city salaries in line with those in New York City's suburbs for the first time. The city did not seek any increases in the work day or work load or any other concessions, as it had with other unions. Negotiations over health benefits were to be conducted separately in talks with the Municipal Labor Committee, an umbrella group for municipal unions which Weingarten chairs.

Observers said Bloomberg sought an early contract in order to win UFT support in his struggle with Governor Eliot Spitzer over school funding. In October 2007, Weingarten assented to two agreements whereby the city and the UFT would jointly seek legislative approval for a new pension deal allowing teachers with 25 years of service to retire at age 55 and providing bonuses to all teachers in schools that showed a certain level of improvement in student achievement. In June 2009, Weingarten negotiated some pension modifications for new teachers in exchange for maintaining the age 55 pension and for allowing teachers to return to their traditional post-Labor Day start date.

New union headquarters
In 2003, Weingarten sold the UFT's headquarters at 260 Park Avenue South and two other buildings at 48 and 49 East 21st Street for $63.6 million and moved the union's offices to Lower Manhattan, purchasing a building at 50 Broadway for $53.75 million and leasing the building next to it, 52 Broadway, for 32 years. The UFT also financed a $40 million renovation of both buildings.

Organizing
The UFT represents all teachers, paraprofessional school employees, and professionals (such as school nurses, school psychologists, and others) in the New York City schools. The UFT saw some membership growth under Weingarten among these workers.

The UFT also has a registered nurse division which represents roughly 2,800 registered nurses at Lutheran Medical Center, Staten Island University Hospital-South, Jewish Home and Hospital Home Health Agency, and the Visiting Nurse Service of New York. The UFT saw more growth in this division, as the Visiting Nurse Service expanded and the union organized non-RN units at the non-profit company.

Weingarten's largest organizing victory came when the UFT organized child care providers in New York City. The campaign began in 2005, and concluded in 2007. The organizing drive—the largest successful union campaign in the city since 1960, when the United Federation of Teachers itself was formed—added 28,000 workers to the union's 113,000 active and 56,000 retired members.

AFT presidency
On February 12, 2008, AFT President Edward J. McElroy announced he would retire at the union's regularly scheduled biennial convention in July. On July 14, Weingarten was elected to succeed him. She is the first openly gay individual to be elected president of a national American labor union. In her first year, she fought for resources to keep schools and other public institutions afloat during the ongoing fiscal crises, and started an AFT Innovation Fund to promote and disseminate innovative educational reforms by teachers and their union.

Views

School reform
Weingarten advocates what she describes as a "bottom up" approach to education reform, and says that public officials should welcome the views—and account for the needs—of teachers when working to help schools better serve their students. She has, as AFT president, criticized state and federal reforms proposed by her opponents.

The AFT, during Weingarten's presidency, has focused scrutiny on well-funded third parties that have attempted to influence education policy—with the Walton Foundation, the largest philanthropic donor in the United States, drawing particular scrutiny. In a 2015 report co-authored with In the Public Interest, the AFT decried the Walton Foundation's pursuit of what the report termed a "market-based model [that] will lead to ... the eventual elimination of public education altogether, in favor of an across-the-board system of privately operated schools."

Weingarten was among nineteen arrested in March 2013 while protesting a Philadelphia School Reform Commission meeting on school closures.

Neighborhood public schools, according to Weingarten, can coexist with charter schools—but she opposes initiatives that work to supplant the former with the latter. Weingarten sees the role of charters as complementary to, rather than competing with, other schools.

"Charter schools should be laboratories for innovation and creative ideas that can be scaled up so they can enrich communities," she has said.

In a 2013 debate in New Haven, Weingarten argued that charter schools pull money from regular school districts.

Standardized testing
Weingarten condemns a "fixation on testing and data over everything else" as "a fundamental flaw in how our nation approaches public education," but accepts the use of standardized tests as one tool among several to evaluate student achievement and teacher performance. As AFT president, she has criticized the No Child Left Behind Act for "allow[ing] high-stakes testing to eclipse all else, including the children themselves." In a 2015 op-ed for The New York Times, she wrote:

Tests should be used to get teachers, parents and school communities the information they need to help students make progress — not to sanction or scapegoat, as they do now with high-stakes tests driving federal education policy. Instead, we need investments to level the playing field for kids, boost innovation, elevate the teaching profession and support educators.

The Every Student Succeeds Act of 2015 (ESSA) passed into law with the AFT's support. The law eliminates the federal requirement that states evaluate teachers according to their students' standardized test scores, and allows states to weigh factors in addition to test scores when judging the performance of school systems. Weingarten has applauded the ESSA for "relegating the era of test-and-punish strategies to the trash heap" and for offering "teachers ... flexibility to try new ways to teach, to meet the needs of their students, and to help their students think critically and analytically instead of focusing on what might be on a high-stakes test." As AFT president, Weingarten favored the act particularly because of provisions that stripped the United States Secretary of Education's role in influencing teacher-evaluation systems and maintained federal funding Title I for schools with high proportions of students from low-income households.

Teacher training and retention
An overemphasis on standardized testing and a shortage of resources, according to Weingarten, has harmed efforts to recruit and retain well-prepared teachers at public schools. "A haphazard approach to the complex and crucial enterprise of educating children," she has written, "[is] unfair to both students and teachers, who want and need to be well-prepared to teach from their first day on the job." In response to a New York Times story about public school systems short of teaching staff, she said that "teachers are used to the pressure cooker but are stressed out because they aren't getting the support, resources, time and respect they need to do their jobs."

Weingarten has proposed—as a means of improving the quality of teachers in American classrooms—the creation of a professional licensing exam, akin to the bar exam taken by lawyers, for new teachers. "Better preparing teachers for entry into the profession," Weingarten says, "will dramatically reduce the loss of new teachers—nearly half of whom leave after fewer than five years—and the loss of knowledge that goes with it."

Poverty and community schools
The AFT, under Weingarten's leadership, has worked to draw attention to economic inequalities within cities and regions that can hobble public schools. With school systems in the United States heavily reliant on local property taxes, systems that rely on depressed or depleted tax bases can find themselves without the financial resources available to comparatively wealthier districts.

Philanthropic efforts in public schools, in Weingarten's view, have incorrectly focused on the educator's role in student performance—"what we now know is 10% of student achievement," she remarked in one interview—to the exclusion of underlying problems, such as poverty, that undermine student progress. "We need to ... treat kids that have the least, give them the most," says Weingarten—"not with a blank check, but actually figure out the supports they need so that they can climb up the ladder of opportunity."

During Weingarten's presidency, the AFT has pushed for creating what the union calls "community schools": schools that serve as hubs for non-academic programs addressed to whole communities. Undergirding that concept is the understanding—as described by former Boston Public Schools superintendent Thomas Payzant, who implemented a community-school model in the city, in a 2005 book—that "students' noneducational realities, such as nutritional deficiencies, medical problems, safety concerns, even daily hunger, are daunting barriers that can obstruct even the most flexible educational program."

To address those perceived needs, community schools offer 'wraparound services' that target identified social issues: job banks to help parents secure employment, for example, or housing counseling for families that lack permanent homes. In a 2008 address given during her first run for the AFT presidency, Weingarten said, in the course of promoting the community-school paradigm:

Imagine schools that are open all day and offer after-school and evening recreational activities, child care and preschool, tutoring and homework assistance. Schools that include dental, medical and counseling clinics ... Imagine if schools had the educational resources children need to thrive, like smaller classes and individualized instruction, plentiful, up-to-date materials and technology anchored to that rich curriculum, decent facilities, an early start for toddlers and a nurturing atmosphere.

The AFT has extolled community schools that operate in Philadelphia, Cincinnati, St. Paul, Minn., Austin, Texas, Providence, R.I., and other cities where the union represents public schoolteachers. The union has itself sponsored community school efforts in Chicago, and in West Virginia, the AFT has launched a public-private partnership—called Reconnecting McDowell—that aims to "enhance educational opportunity for children in the McDowell County public schools in Central Appalachia, while addressing the underlying problems caused by severe and chronic poverty and economic decline." Efforts through the program have included the building of a "teacher village" for educators, setup of an internship program for high-school students, and mentoring of students from families in which they would be the first to attend college.

Teacher tenure
Weingarten has resisted attempts to curtail or eliminate tenure protections for public-school teachers, arguing that the outright removal of tenure protection would hurt the quality of classroom instruction. "We know that the states with the highest academic performance have the strongest due process protections for teachers," Weingarten wrote to Time magazine in 2014. "Research shows that our most at-risk kids need more-experienced teachers. But why would these teachers stay at schools with few tools, little support and no ability to voice their concerns?"

Education policy proposals built around eliminating tenure have drawn derision from Weingarten as "faddish reforms" at the expense of what she terms "the most critical issues confronting American education": teacher training, education funding, school safety, and educational reinforcement at home. She downplays the idea of worker protections as obstacles to improving schools, describing tenure "not a job for life, [but] ensuring fairness and due process before someone can be fired, plain and simple."

When United States Secretary of Education Arne Duncan issued a statement siding with a California superior court judge who ruled the state's teacher tenure protections unconstitutional, Weingarten responded that Duncan had "added to the polarization" in debates over education policy, and charged that focusing on "quick fixes, blame games or silver bullets" such as ending tenure had "set us back in our effort to help all kids succeed." The AFT has worked, however, to reshape tenure in some states. In 2011 Weingarten offered a plan that would rely on a teacher-evaluation system with multiple parts—including assessment of student improvement on tests—to give tenured teachers rated unsatisfactory one year to improve, and allow the firing of teachers who fail to meet that deadline within the next 100 days. The proposal followed a 2008 agreement between Weingarten and District of Columbia public schools chancellor Michelle Rhee that allowed the termination of Washington Teachers' Union members evaluated as ineffective, after a one-year period—and in public remarks, Weingarten has discussed her role in efforts to modernize tenure elsewhere.

Pensions and retirement
Under Weingarten, the AFT has combatted efforts to shift responsibility for retirement investing to teachers—with Weingarten herself drawing notoriety, according to Institutional Investor magazine, as "the most public face in the battle for defined benefit pension funds." In a 2014 op-ed, Weingarten attacked "people who press ... to convert defined benefit pensions to 401(k) plans," asserting that advocates of 401(k) plans "never talk about the benefits retirees are likely to get under these new plans — because it's likely to be a lot less than retirees need to get by."

In its campaign against moving teachers into defined-contribution pensions, AFT has argued that shifting investment risks to individuals has led to deleterious results for retirees. Hedge funds that manage teacher pension investments have drawn heavy criticism from AFT; the union, in 2015, prepared a report that concluded such investments "exacted a high cost, had laggard returns and generally moved in tandem with the overall stock market." The report came in the wake of a 2013 AFT study that charged some hedge-fund managers with a conflict of interest—according to BuzzFeed, the 2013 report said that while managing teachers' defined benefit pensions, some fund managers had "support[ed] groups like the Manhattan Institute, which has recommended replacing pensions with 401(k)-type plans, and Students First, whose national branch advocates eliminating defined-benefit plans."

Political activities
Weingarten and the UFT endorsed Republican George Pataki for re-election as Governor of New York in 2002. Julia Levy reported in the New York Sun on February 1, 2005, that candidates for mayor of New York were meeting with Weingarten, and "political experts" were saying that "Weingarten has become something of a kingmaker." The UFT's endorsement, wrote Levy, meant "votes, campaign volunteers, and information."

A lifelong Democrat, Weingarten is a member of the Democratic National Committee (DNC). She was an early and critically important supporter of Howard Dean as Chairman of the DNC. She is a superdelegate who was pledged to Hillary Clinton during the 2008 presidential primary. In January 2009, she was mentioned as a possible candidate in the appointment process to replace Clinton's U.S. Senate seat.

In one of the Wikileaks emails from John Podesta, chair of the Hillary Clinton campaign, Weingarten states her desire to "go after" the National Nurses United union after their endorsement of Senator Bernie Sanders for President of the United States.

In 2020, Weingarten was named a candidate for Secretary of Education in the Biden Administration. She was an elector for the State of New York in the 2020 United States Presidential Election.

Criticism

Public school governance and oversight
In spring 1998 in the City Journal, the quarterly magazine of the conservative Manhattan Institute think tank, Sol Stern dismissed Weingarten's claim to support school reform as "pure union propaganda."

Carl Campanile reported in the January 21, 2004, New York Post that Weingarten had called for union members to voice concerns by sending e-mails to the schools chancellor, Joel Klein, and Mayor Bloomberg  "about the micromanagement and mismanagement issues that make your job more difficult this year."

Pundit John Stossel wrote, in an opinion piece in the conservative New York Sun, about a rally held by Weingarten at Madison Square Garden at which teachers demanded "a new contract and more money." Stossel said that the teachers unions "can pay for expensive rallies at 'the world's most famous arena' because every teacher in a unionized district like New York must give up some of his salary to the union. Even teachers who don't like the union, teachers who believe in school choice, and teachers who could make more on the open market must fork over their money to support the unions that fight against school choice and merit pay." Calling the present situation in New York schools a nightmare, Stossel wrote that "the unions fight to protect the nightmare" and mocked Weingarten's promise that the UFT would "police our own profession" with  "I'd like to police my own job, too. And I'll bet some students would just love to police their own homework!" He accused Weingarten of "protect[ing] incompetents" and "reward[ing] mediocrity." He said that he had "confronted Weingarten," telling her, "Unionized monopolies like yours fail. In this case, it is the children who - who you are failing." She replied by rejecting the label "unionized monopoly" and by saying that her critics "don't really care about kids."

The editorial board of the New York Post wrote, on February 28, 2007, about a planned gathering of opponents of Mayor Michael Bloomberg's public-school reform efforts, describing some of the participants as "a bought-and-paid-for chorus of false reformers" who "dance to the tunes of Randi Weingarten ... who has been trying to derail real reform since Mayor Mike wrested control of the schools from the educrats some five years ago." Calling the UFT "one of the richest special interests in America", the editorial board maintained that Weingarten does not care "about New York's schoolchildren" but is loyal "to her members."

In an opinion piece in the conservative New York Sun, Andrew Wolf wrote that Mayor Bloomberg had called the UFT the "number one" obstacle to education reform, but had reached a compromise with a coalition including the UFT, ACORN, and the Working Families Party. Wolf said that Weingarten, speaking to parent groups in a conference call, had called Department of Education officials "absolute and complete assholes" who "can't be trusted."

On September 30, 2009, in the conservative City Journal, Sol Stern asserted that "the UFT and the Bloomberg administration [had] increasingly developed a cartel-like working relationship, with New York taxpayers paying the price."
 
The editorial board of The New York Post said on June 2, 2009, that Weingarten, "who'd previously vowed to gut City Hall's control over the schools," had now "delivered a nearly full-throated endorsement of it," reflecting her recognition of the "sweeping, and undeniable" progress in test scores of elementary-school pupils,

Reacting on July 7, 2009, to Weingarten's statement, upon taking control of the AFT, that New York City is "the best laboratory in the world for trying new things," the conservative editorial board of The Wall Street Journal asserted this could be true "if it weren't for Ms. Weingarten's union," and wrote that the UFT under her direction had done everything possible "to block significant reforms to New York's public schools."

In a 2009 essay by Steven Brill in The New Yorker, New York City Schools Chancellor Joel Klein was quoted as calling the teacher tenure policies defended by the UFT "ridiculous"—with Klein asserting that "the three principles that govern our system are lockstep compensation, seniority, and tenure. All three are not right for our children." Brill attributed to "many education reformers" the belief "that the U.F.T. and its political allies had gained so much clout" over the years "that it had become impossible for the city's Board of Education, which already shared a lot of power with local boards, to maintain effective school oversight." However, Brill later reversed his view of Weingarten, and proposed that New York City Mayor Michael Bloomberg appoint her chancellor of the school system.

Raising salaries and merit pay

During her tenure as UFT president, Weingarten pushed for higher salaries and improved training for teachers, often agreeing to longer work days and more tutoring time in order to win better pay. Between 2002 and 2007, salaries for New York City teachers rose 42 percent. Weingarten has endorsed merit pay for city teachers, and in 2007 negotiated a controversial contract which paid teachers bonuses if their students' test scores rose.

Nicole Gelinas wrote in the conservative City Journal on June 16, 2005, that "Weingarten declared that merit-pay plans 'pit teachers against each other instead of encouraging a collaborative school culture.' What Weingarten and the union do not see ... is that competition is healthy." Gelinas went on to assert that "until Weingarten budges ... virtue will have to be its own reward for New York's teachers."

In an opinion column on June 14, 1999, Bob McManus asserted that "67 percent of New York City's fourth-graders" had "turned up functionally illiterate in state tests in May," and that the response from the UFT was to call for "more 'classroom resources' (i.e., Big League raises)." McManus argued that "there's more to this crisis than money—or the lack of it," and called on Weingarten to "get out of the way of folks who believe they can get the job done for less."

Andrew Wolf, in an October 19, 2007, op-ed in the New York Sun entitled "Socialism for Schools," argued that despite some observers' perception that "Mayor Bloomberg and Chancellor Klein [had] won a victory over the teachers' union by gaining approval of a merit pay scheme," the real winner was Weingarten, who had gained power for the UFT. The new plan, Wolf asserted, did not reward individual performance but treated each school as a collective, with union committees dividing bonuses among all union members, including school secretaries and others.

In October 2012, after what the New York Times called "months of intense and late-night negotiations," Weingarten and New Jersey Governor Chris Christie reached a "landmark compromise," agreeing on a new contract for teachers in the Newark school system. Although, as the Times noted, Weingarten "had criticized what she calls 'merit pay schemes,'" she "agreed to embrace the concept in exchange for a promise that teachers would have a rare role in evaluating performance." After this agreement was reached, supporters of merit pay for New York City public-school teachers expressed hope that the UFT, which had "always opposed individual merit pay initiatives," would now follow Weingarten's example.

Also in 2012, Weingarten criticized what she calls "merit pay schemes".

Teacher tenure
In 2009, when New York state Assemblywoman Catherine Nolan said that she had been prevented by a hip injury from introducing a measure to form a commission to study teacher-tenure reform—which the UFT had agreed to as a compromise measure—the New York Post editorialized that the legislative inaction which resulted "ha[d] the United Federation of Teachers chief's fingerprints all over it." The Post argued that Nolan had managed to pass "77 other education bills ... while she was out for surgery," and called it likely that Weingarten had influenced Nolan's decision.

In a February 2011 interview, Weingarten acknowledged that "tenure needs to be reformed," noting that the AFT had adopted recommendations for tenure reform. Observing that the issue of teacher tenure had "erupted recently, with many districts anticipating layoffs because of slashed budgets" and with mayors such as Michael R. Bloomberg in New York City and Cory A. Booker in Newark "attack[ing] seniority laws," the New York Times reported that Weingarten had agreed to support some kind of tenure reform.

Teacher pension plans
Weingarten has strongly supported defined-benefit pension plans for teachers. Sol Stern argued in the conservative City Journal on June 25, 2009, that an agreement reached between Weingarten and the Bloomberg administration on teacher pensions would "probably wind up harming Gotham's students." Under the agreement, Stern asserted, teachers would "make no sacrifices to help ease the city's economic and fiscal crisis" and would even get "a shorter work year," with a ten-and-a-half-week summer vacation.

In April 2013, Weingarten organized an action to confront Dan Loeb—a New York investment manager and board member of the New York chapter of lobbying organization StudentsFirst—over his opposition to defined-benefit pension plans for public employees. In the same month, the Wall Street Journal editorial board painted Weingarten as "trying to strong-arm pension trustees not to invest in hedge funds or private-equity funds that support education reform." Weingarten had, according to the editorial board, "tried to sandbag hedge fund investor Dan Loeb at a conference sponsored by the Council of Institutional Investors," describing her as troubled by the fact "that Mr. Loeb puts his own money behind school reform and charter schools."

Weingarten had, according to the Journal editorial, demanded a meeting with Loeb at the conference, but the editorial board wrote that he had "wisely declined the honor of showing up for this political mugging." This "attempted ambush," continued the Journal editorial, "coincide[d] with a new report that her union sent to pension trustees this week called 'Ranking Asset Managers,'" with the rankings based not on "return on investment" but on such matters "as a manager's position on collective bargaining, privatization [read: vouchers] or proposals to discontinue providing benefits through defined benefit plans." The editorial board imputed "Ms. Weingarten's union fury" to her "know[ing that] unions are losing the moral and political debate over reform, as more Americans conclude that her policies are consigning millions of children to a life of diminished opportunity." Weingarten had "bull[ied] pension trustees to bully hedge funds," the editorial board charged, "to cut off funding for poor kids in Harlem. Every time we wonder if we're too cynical about unions, they remind us that we're not nearly cynical enough."

School choice and charter schools
Weingarten has opposed charter schools and school choice.
In a City Journal essay in 1999, Sol Stern contrasted "Milwaukee's healthy approach to school choice" with what he termed Weingarten's promise to "fight with every resource at [her] disposal any attempt by the mayor to create a voucher system" in New York. Given what Stern described as the UFT's "impressive" resources, he deemed Mayor Giuliani courageous to take on "what promises to be," Stern opined, "a long fight for the beleaguered parents of New York's schoolchildren."

Writing about a 1999 Emergency Coalition Against Vouchers "teach-in" attended by Weingarten, Stern asserted that "calling the rally ... a teach-in was almost Orwellian. Despite the nostalgic references to the Sixties," Stern continued, "this event was the antithesis of insurgency." Weingarten, he alleged, had made it clear that whatever the wishes of parents and the public, she "had the political clout to block even a tiny experimental voucher plan."

In a February 6, 2007, op-ed in the New York Post, Thomas W. Carroll of an advocacy organization called the Foundation for Education Reform & Accountability charged that Weingarten sought to unionize charter schools against the will of the teachers at those schools. To this end, Carroll wrote, Weingarten had tried  pursue a unionization process known as card check, which involves the gathering signatures from pro-union teachers in lieu of a unionization vote by secret ballot. According to Carroll's op-ed, Weingarten had claimed that teachers had been fired from charter schools for wanting a union, but lacked the evidence to prove "these wild allegations."

In an April 10, 2009, article, The New York Post asserted that UFT activists had "sought to push City Council members into grilling Department of Education officials during a hearing on charter schools ... while taking it easy on union officials." When those efforts—described by the article as "puppeteering"— became public, Weingarten told WNYW that she would "make some changes at the union to make sure that that never happens again" and said that former City Council Education Committee Chairwoman Eva Moskowitz, who had criticized the UFT's actions, "used to ask us all the time, when she was education chair, for questions to prep the City Council about what's really going on in schools." Moskowitz, who after leaving the council had become founder and CEO of Success Academy Charter Schools, called Weingarten's charge "utterly false" and "defamatory."

The editorial board of the New York Post wrote, on August 6, 2011, about a PowerPoint presentation by an AFT lobbyist that "underscore[d] the sharp disparity between the union's public posture and its actual policies." The presentation, according to the editorial's retelling, had "detailed how the union successfully rebuffed efforts" in Connecticut to enact a parent trigger law designed to let parents to "reconstitute a consistently failing school into a charter school." After the presentation was made public, the editorial observed, an AFT statement said that the presentation did "not represent AFT's position." The editorial quoted Gwen Samuel of the Connecticut Parents Union, a pro-parent trigger advocacy organization, saying: "I'm concerned that they [AFT] were so bold. This screams, 'I'm untouchable.'"

The editorial board of the New York Post wrote on October 8, 2012, that the film Won't Back Down—a fictionalized account of a parent-trigger takeover at a neighborhood public school—had drawn what the editorial termed "the acid-laced enmity" of Weingarten, who had accused the film of employing "the most blatant stereotypes and caricatures I have ever seen" and of placing blame for failing schools "on the wrong culprit: America's teachers unions." AFT members protested outside the film's premiere, the editorial noted. Rich Lowry, the editor of the conservative National Review, opined in the Post that Weingarten objected to the film not because its characters were, as she described them, stereotypes, but because "they are revelations."

Teacher accountability
Weingarten has been frequently criticized over the years for resisting attempts to address the problem of teacher incompetence. When New York schools Chancellor Joel Klein announced a new peer-review process in 2007 to identify bad teachers, Weingarten called the plan "a stake in the heart of every teacher."

The editors of the New York Sun noted on September 17, 2007, that Weingarten, when asked on a talk show about teacher accountability, replied: "When people say to me, you know, well, why shouldn't teachers be, you know, judged on the test scores of their kids? I say to them ... would you want your oncologist, or your mom or dad's oncologist to be graded on the survival rates of his or her patients?" The Sun's editors noted that doctors are, in fact, "held accountable for performance. ... Would that teachers were held to such standards as exist in the oncology ward."

The New York Post noted on January 22, 2008, that "Weingarten promised a full-arsenal fight if the Department of Education attempts to judge individual teachers based on their students' test scores."

Regarding a new pilot program to determine teacher effectiveness, Weingarten commented in 2008: "There are so many educational and technical flaws in this concept that I find it shocking that the school system is even considering it."

Editorializing about Weingarten's acceptance speech at the 2008 AFT convention, the New York Post commented that she had "laid out her vision for 'community schools' that do everything but, well, teach." The Post described her as envisioning a "one-stop nanny state ... owned and operated by Randi Weingarten & Co." and suggested that her "push for all-purpose schools" was a way of "dodg[ing] teacher accountability in the one area schools are built for – teaching kids how to read, write and do numbers."

Writing in the New Yorker on August 31, 2009, Steven Brill quoted a school principal as saying that Weingarten "would protect a dead body in the classroom." He quoted a teacher who had been suspended for incompetence, and who still earned over a hundred thousand dollars a year, as complaining that "Before Bloomberg and Klein took over, there was no such thing as incompetence."

United States Education Secretary Arne Duncan was scheduled to hold a press conference at PS 65 in Brooklyn on May 18, 2010, but after Weingarten made a call to Duncan complaining about the school's principal, Daysi Garcia, Duncan changed the press-conference venue. The New York Post editorialized that it was "no surprise that Garcia is the sort of principal Weingarten can't abide," given that Garcia "makes her teachers work — and she demands results." The Post cited a New Yorker article which had reported that Garcia had dared to identify and remove incompetent teachers, and consequently turned the school around, improving reading and math scores dramatically. The Post suggested that the lessons here were that "It's not just charter schools that get the union's goat — it's any school that gives kids a decent education by holding teachers accountable" and that "The union will fight to the very end."

Writing on May 30, 2013, about efforts to get "New York state's teachers unions to accept personal accountability as a bedrock principle of public-education reform," Bob McManus of the New York Post commented that Weingarten "once seemed to have a conscience on such matters — but no more," adhering to the principle that "No tenured teacher, under any circumstances, is to be held to account for any failing of any sort."

New York City schools chancellor Dennis M. Walcott wrote on September 6, 2013, that the Board of Education had managed, despite resistance by the UFT, to establish "an accountability system that included qualitative reviews and Progress Reports," to end "the absurd practice of promoting students to higher grades if they lacked the skills to succeed," and to institute "the first genuine teacher-evaluation system in the history of the school system."

Private-school tax credits
Weingarten has been a severe critic of proposals to allow parents to use tax credits to help pay to send their children to private school. The editors of the New York Sun on November 21, 2006, quoted Weingarten's statement that allowing parents to apply tax credits to private-school tuition was "like saying government should reimburse people who drink bottled water instead of tap water — or those who park in a garage even when there is space on the street," the editors of the New York Sun argued on November 21, 2006, that "bottled water and garage parking are luxuries, more expensive than tap water or street parking," while educating a child in a New York Catholic school, for example, costs one-quarter as much as educating a public-school student.

Class size
Smaller class sizes have also been a major initiative of the UFT under Weingarten. She attempted to tie smaller class sizes to salaries in each of the three collective bargaining agreements she has negotiated, and linked class size to school repair and rebuilding issues. In 2003, Weingarten and the UFT pushed for a change to the New York City Charter which would force the city to reduce class sizes. The charter revision became caught in lawsuits and was eventually dropped, although Weingarten continued to advocate for smaller class sizes.

A New York Sun editorial on May 20, 2003, questioned Weingarten's focus on this issue and challenged her argument that class size is a critical factor in learning, noting that "America has been reducing class sizes steadily for the last half century, with little to show in results."

Teacher seniority
Weingarten has been a staunch supporter of the LIFO policy ("last in, first out"), otherwise known as teacher seniority. When Education Secretary Arne Duncan changed a February 2011 speech at the last minute to remove a negative reference to the LIFO policy, under which the last teacher to be hired must be the first one fired, the New York Post editorialized that the action "has the fingerprints of Randi Weingarten and the American Federation of Teachers all over it." Asked in a 2011 Wall Street Journal interview about LIFO, Weingarten defended it, saying: "It's not the perfect mechanism but it's the best mechanism we have. You have cronyism and corruption and discrimination issues. We're saying let's do things the right way. We don't want to see people getting laid off based on who they know instead of what they know. We don't want to see people get laid off based on how much they cost."

School building conditions
Poor schooling conditions, namely run-down public schools, have also drawn Weingarten's attention. The city of New York has neglected building conditions for many years.

Subsidized housing for teachers
In an October 5, 2007, New York Sun article, Eliot Brown wrote that a new Bronx apartment complex would be open only to UFT members: "Our members have said we want to live in the city and raise our families in the city, but we can't afford it, so this is something we've been looking at for a while," Weingarten said.

In December 2007, Weingarten cancelled the subsidized-housing deal after discovering that the developer would not be using unionized construction workers. Unions, she said, "should be standing up for each other." The New York Post commented that "it clearly doesn't occur to Weingarten that using non-union labor is a major reason developers can build 'affordable' apartments" and that "she is imperilling a project that is beneficial to her teacher constituency for the 'greater good' of the broader labor movement." The Post noted that Weingarten, in addition to running the UFT, "also chairs the Municipal Labor Committee – an umbrella group of more than 100 city unions." Observing that because of her solidarity, "200 or so teachers may lose out on inexpensive apartments and – if the project falls through – several jobs won't be created at all," the Post alluded to the "biblical adage ... that a man can't serve two masters."

Teacher dress codes
Sol Stern wrote in the Summer 1998 issue of City Journal about Weingarten's opposition to a proposed dress code for teachers, calling it "a diversion from the real job at hand."

Union solidarity
The New York Post criticized Weingarten in a February 6, 2013, editorial for signing on to a report by a coalition of unions and other groups calling for a range of new regulations to govern foreign workers. "We're not surprised the AFT is on board," the Post commented. "If you think of our public schools primarily as a jobs program, it makes perfect sense."

Plagiarized speech
A speech that Weingarten gave in 2011 turned out to have been plagiarized from a NY 1 series on a flawed Board of Education computer system. NY 1 responded, saying "When a journalist, politician or student uses someone else's words without attribution in a speech or a paper, it's called plagiarism – and it's often enough to get a journalist fired, a politician embarrassed or a student kicked out of school".

WTU conflict
In 2010, the AFT and Weingarten specifically were charged with interfering in the local elections of the Washington Teachers Union (WTU). The elections had been scheduled for May but postponed because of a dispute over procedural questions. In August of that year, Weingarten imposed a deadline on WTU President George Parker to comply with an order "to hold a mid-September election for new officers and delegates, or the contest will be taken out of his hands and conducted by the national parent organization." Parker objected that Weingarten had no authority to interfere in this manner. Weingarten ultimately took over the election.

Allegation by Mike Pompeo 
In November 2022, Mike Pompeo called Weingarten the most dangerous person in the world.

Personal life
On October 11, 2007, Weingarten publicly announced she is a lesbian. Weingarten introduced Liz Margolies, a psychotherapist and health care activist, as her partner while accepting the Empire State Pride Agenda's 2007 Community Service Award from Christine Quinn. By December 2012, she was in a relationship with Rabbi Sharon Kleinbaum of Congregation Beit Simchat Torah.  They married March 25, 2018.

In December 2014, Weingarten wrote in Jezebel that she had almost been raped just after her junior year in college.

See also

 American Federation of Labor and Congress of Industrial Organizations
 LGBT culture in New York City
 LGBT people from New York City

References

External links

|-

1957 births
Living people
American trade union leaders
Women trade union leaders
Presidents of the American Federation of Teachers
Women presidents of organizations
American labor lawyers
American legal scholars
American women legal scholars
Lesbian trade unionists
Democratic National Committee people
2000 United States presidential electors
2020 United States presidential electors
New York (state) Democrats
Lawyers from New York City
New York (state) lawyers
People involved in plagiarism controversies
Cardozo School of Law faculty
Benjamin N. Cardozo School of Law alumni
Cornell University School of Industrial and Labor Relations alumni
LGBT Jews
LGBT people from New York (state)
20th-century American Jews
21st-century American Jews
People from Rockland County, New York